Anthony Robert "Tony" Ortega (June 7, 1928 – October 30, 2022) was an American jazz clarinetist, saxophonist, and flautist.

Early life 
Ortega was born in Los Angeles. He began to play the saxophone at age 14 and studied the instrument under Lloyd Reese. He was heavily-influenced by and introduced to musicians by his cousin, Ray Vasquez.

Career 
In 1947, Ortega played with Earle Spencer. From 1948 to 1951, he served in the United States Army. He became a member of Lionel Hampton's group, which toured Europe; while there he also recorded with Gigi Gryce, Art Farmer, and Milt Buckner, as well as with Norwegian players while in Oslo in 1954. He also met his future wife, pianist and vibraphonist Mona Ørbeck, at the Penguin jazz club in Oslo; they married later that year. Upon his return to southern California, he put a band together and worked briefly in Los Angeles, but relocated to New York City in 1955, playing with Nat Pierce for two years. In 1958, he returned to Los Angeles, where he worked with Paul Bley, Claude Williamson, and the Lighthouse All Stars.

In the 1960s, he played mostly in the Southwest and California, and worked on film soundtracks such as The Pawnbroker (1964). Ortega recorded the soundtrack for the movie Gloria (1980) starring Gena Rowlands. He can be heard playing throughout the movie with Tommy Tedesco on guitar.

He worked with Don Ellis and Gerald Wilson in 1965 and with Lalo Schifrin in 1968. In the early-1970s, he toured internationally with Quincy Jones and continued working with Wilson into the 1980s. He toured and recorded in Paris several times in the 1990s. As of October 2021, he was still performing actively at Mr. Peabody's in Encinitas, California.

Discography
A Man and His Horns (1956)
Chamber Music for Moderns with the Nat Pierce Quintet (Coral, 1957)
Jazz for Young Moderns (And Old Buzzards, Too) (Bethlehem, 1958?)
New Dance (Revelation, 1967)
Permutations (Revelation, 1968)
A Delanto (Jazz Chronicles, 1976)
Rain Dance (Discovery, 1978)
On Evidence (Evidence, 1992)
Neuf (Evidence, 1996)
Bonjour (Harmonia Mundi, 2001)
Scattered Clouds (hatOLOGY, 2001)
Afternoon in Paris (hatOLOGY, 2007)

References

External links
 
 

1928 births
2022 deaths
American jazz saxophonists
American male saxophonists
American jazz flautists
American jazz clarinetists
Musicians from Los Angeles
21st-century American saxophonists
Jazz musicians from California
21st-century clarinetists
21st-century American male musicians
American male jazz musicians
21st-century flautists